Vengalil Krishnan Krishna Menon (3 May 1896 – 6 October 1974) was an Indian academic, politician, and non-career diplomat.  He was described by some as the second most powerful man in India, after the first Prime Minister of India, Jawaharlal Nehru. He wrote the first draft of the Preamble to the Constitution of India, initiated the idea of the Constituent Assembly of India and was the architect, and the person who coined the name, of the Non-Aligned Movement.

He was chairman of the Indian delegation at the United Nations General Assembly from 1953 to 1962, at sessions of the United Nations Trusteeship Council from 1953 to 1956, and to the Eighteen Nation Committee on Disarmament.  He was a member of the Indian National Congress and also at one time a member of the British Labour Party.

Noted for his eloquence, brilliance and forceful and highly abrasive personality, Menon inspired widespread adulation as well as angry detraction in both India and the West. To his supporters, he was an unapologetic champion of India in the face of Western imperialism, who famously "taught the white man his place". To his Western detractors, he was "Nehru's evil genius". US president Dwight Eisenhower characterised him as a "menace ... governed by an ambition to prove himself the master international manipulator and politician of the age", but Indian President K.R. Narayanan eulogised him as a truly great man. Decades after his death, Menon remains an enigmatic and controversial figure.

As a young man, Menon served as founding editor of the Pelican imprint of Penguin Books.  He led the overseas wing of the Indian independence movement, launching the India League in London, aggressively campaigning within the United Kingdom to win public support for Indian independence, and rallying the support of world powers such as the Soviet Union. In the immediate wake of independence, Menon emerged as engineer of and spokesman for India's foreign policy, and, more generally, architect of the non-aligned movement. He headed India's diplomatic missions to the United Kingdom and the United Nations, and distinguished himself in diplomatic matters including the Suez crisis. In 1957, Menon had set the record for the longest speech (8 hours) before the U.N. Security Council while defending India's rights to the disputed territory of Kashmir, in the process earning widespread popularity and the sobriquet "Hero of Kashmir".

Returning to India, he was repeatedly elected to both houses of the Indian parliament from constituencies as varied as Mumbai, Bengal, and Trivandrum in his native state of Kerala.  He served as a minister without portfolio and later as Minister of Defence, overseeing the modernization of the Indian military and development of the Indian military-industrial infrastructure, and spearheading the Indian annexation of Goa. He resigned in the wake of the Sino-Indian War, following allegations of India's military unpreparedness, but remained counselor to Nehru, member of parliament and elder statesman until his death.

Early life and education
Menon was born in an aristocratic Nair family at Thiruvangad Thalassery and  later moved to Panniyankara in Kozhikode, Kerala, in the Vengalil family of Malabar. His father Adv. Komath Krishna Kurup, Kottappally, Vatakara, the son of Orlathiri Udayavarma, Raja of Kadathanadu and Komath Sreedevi Kettilamma, was a wealthy and influential lawyer. His mother was the granddaughter of Raman Menon who had been the Dewan of Travancore between 1815 and 1817, serving Gowri Parvati Bayi. Menon had his early education at the Zamorin's College, Kozhikode. In 1918 he graduated from Presidency College, Chennai, with a B.A. in History and Economics. While studying in the Madras Law College, he became involved in Theosophy and was actively associated with Annie Besant and the Home Rule Movement. He was a leading member of the "Brothers of Service", founded by Annie Besant who spotted his gifts and helped him travel to England in 1924.

Life and activities in England
Menon studied at London School of Economics and was awarded Bachelor of Science in economics and Master of Science in economics from University of London. At London School of Economics, Harold Laski described him as the best student he had ever had. Later he studied at University College London and in 1930, he was awarded an M.A. in Industrial Psychology with First Class Honours from University of London, for a thesis entitled An Experimental Study of the Mental Processes Involved in Reasoning, and in 1934 he was awarded an MSc in Political Science with First Class Honours from the London School of Economics, for a thesis entitled English Political Thought in the Seventeenth Century. He had continued to study law and was admitted to the Middle Temple, also, in 1934, thus marking the end of his formal education at the age of 37.

During the 1930s, Menon worked as an editor for Bodley Head and Twentieth Century Library, and then with Penguin Books with founder Sir Allen Lane. According to S Muthiah, the idea for Penguin Books was Menon's. In his celebrated history of the old British port, Madras Miscellany, he writes:

 .. he (Menon) dreamt of flooding the market with cheap paperback editions of quality titles. He discussed the idea with a colleague at Bodley Head and Allen Lane jumped at it. In 1935, they quit Bodley Head and with 100 Pounds capital, set up office in the crypt of St Pancras Borough Church. Thus was born Penguin Books.

Menon edited the titles published by Pelican Books which grew into respected British institution with great political and cultural influence.

Political life in the UK
After joining the Labour Party he was elected borough councillor of St Pancras, London. St. Pancras later conferred on him the Freedom of the Borough, the only other person so honoured being George Bernard Shaw. The Labour Party began preparations to nominate him as its candidate for the Dundee Parliamentary constituency in 1939 but that fell through because of his perceived connections with the Communist Party. He resigned (or was expelled, according to other sources) from the Labour Party in protest but rejoined in 1944.

India League and the independence movement

Menon became a passionate proponent of India's independence, working as a journalist and as President of the India League from 1928 to 1947, and a close friend of fellow Indian nationalist leader and future Prime Minister Jawaharlal Nehru, as well as such political and intellectual figures as Bertrand Russell, J.B.S. Haldane, Michael Foot, Aneurin Bevan, and E.M. Forster, whose A Passage to India he secured the publication of, according to Shashi Tharoor. Menon's legendary relationship with Nehru would later be analogised by Sir Isaiah Berlin as like that of Ezra Pound and T.S. Eliot.
In 1932 he inspired a fact-finding delegation headed by Labour MP Ellen Wilkinson to visit India, and edited its report entitled "Conditions in India", obtaining a preface from his friend Bertrand Russell. Menon also worked assiduously to ensure that Nehru would succeed Mahatma Gandhi as the moral leader and executive of the Indian independence movement, and to clear the way for Nehru's eventual accession as the first Prime Minister of an independent India. As Secretary, he built the India League into the most influential Indian lobby in the British Parliament, and actively turned British popular sentiment towards the cause of Indian independence. India League meetings would take place in Indian restaurants and cafes, which were seen as hubs attracting British Indians. Notable meeting places include Ayub Ali's Shah Jalal Coffee House and Shah Abdul Majid Qureshi's India Centre.

The origins of what would become the policy of non-alignment were evident in Menon's personal sympathies even in England, where he simultaneously condemned both Britain and Germany, although he did march several times in anti-Nazi demonstrations. When asked whether India would prefer to be ruled by the British or the Germans, Menon replied that "[one] might as well ask a fish if it prefers to be fried in butter or margarine".

Roles in post-independence India

High Commissioner to the United Kingdom
After India gained independence in 1947, Menon was appointed High Commissioner of India to the United Kingdom, a post in which he remained until 1952. Menon's intense distrust of the West extended to the United Kingdom itself, and his frequent opposition to British political manoeuvres eventually led MI5 to deem him a "serious menace to security". From 1929 onwards Menon had been kept under surveillance, with a warrant to intercept his correspondence being issued in December 1933, identifying him as an "important worker in the Indian revolutionary movement". Clandestine surveillance intensified following Menon's 1946 meeting in Paris with Soviet Foreign Minister Vyacheslav Molotov, and Indian independence. In 2007, hundreds of pages of MI5 files documenting their coverage of Menon were released, including transcripts of phone conversations and intercepted correspondences with other statesmen and Nehru himself.

During his tenure as the high commissioner, Menon was accused of being involved in the Jeep scandal case of 1948, but the Government closed the case in 1955, ignoring suggestion by the Inquiry Committee.

India's representative to the United Nations

In 1949, Menon accepted the command of the Indian delegation to the United Nations, a position he would hold until 1962. He earned a reputation for brilliance in the UN, frequently engineering elegant solutions to complex international political issues, including a peace plan for Korea, a ceasefire in Indo-China, the deadlocked disarmament talks, and the French withdrawal from the UN over Algeria.

Diplomacy and non-alignment
During this period, Menon was a spokesman for Nehru's foreign policy, dubbed non-alignment in 1952, charting a third course between the US and the Soviet Union. Menon was particularly critical of the United States, and frequently expressed sympathies with Soviet policies, earning the ire of many Indians by voting against a UN resolution calling for the USSR to withdraw troops from Hungary, although he reversed his stance three weeks later under pressure from New Delhi.

China and the United Nations
Menon also supported the admission of China to the United Nations, which earned him the enmity of many American statesmen, including Senator William F. Knowland. In 1955, Menon intervened in the case of several American airmen who had been held by China, meeting with Chinese premier Zhou Enlai before flying to Washington to confer with and counsel American President Dwight Eisenhower and Secretary of State John Foster Dulles, at the request of British Prime Minister Anthony Eden.

Nuclear disarmament
Menon was a passionate opponent of nuclear weapons, and partnered with many in his quest against their proliferation. Throughout the 1950s, Menon liaised with Bertrand Russell, with whom he had previously collaborated in the India League.

Suez Crisis
During the Suez Crisis, Menon attempted to persuade a recalcitrant Gamal Nasser to compromise with the West, and was instrumental in moving Western powers towards an awareness that Nasser might prove willing to compromise. During the emergency conference on Suez convened in London, Menon offered a counterproposal to John Foster Dulles' plan for resolution, in which Egypt would be allowed to retain control of the Suez Canal. Menon's proposal was initially estimated by US diplomats to have more support than the Dulles plan, and was widely viewed as an attempt to hybridise the Dulles plan with Egypt's claims. Ultimately, the Dulles plan passed, with Menon voting against, alongside Russia, Indonesia and Sri Lanka. Menon, however, markedly softened his opposition in the final hours, leaving only Soviet Foreign Minister Dmitri Shepilov in absolute contraposition.

Speech on Kashmir

On 23 January 1957 Menon delivered an unprecedented eight-hour speech defending India's stand on Kashmir. To date, the speech is the longest ever delivered in the United Nations, covering five hours of the 762nd meeting on 23 January, and two hours and forty-eight minutes on the 24th, reportedly concluding with Menon's collapse on the Security Council floor. Between the two parts, Menon collapsed from exhaustion and had to be hospitalized. During the filibuster, Nehru moved swiftly and successfully to consolidate Indian power in Kashmir. Menon's passionate defence of Indian sovereignty in Kashmir enlarged his base of support in India, and led to the Indian press temporarily dubbing him the "Hero of Kashmir".

Minister of Defence
Krishna Menon became a member of the Rajya Sabha in 1953 from Madras. In 1956, he joined the Union Cabinet as Minister without Portfolio and was made Minister of Defence in April 1957, after winning the North Mumbai seat to the Lok Sabha. Menon was a substantially more powerful and high-profile figure than his predecessors, and brought with him a degree of governmental, public, and international attention that India's military had not previously known. He suspended the seniority system within the army, replacing it with a merit-based method of promotion, and extensively restructured much of India's military command system, eventually leading to the resignation of the Chief of the Army Staff, General K.S. Thimayya. Critics accused Menon of disregarding tradition in favour of personal caprice; Menon countered that he was seeking to improve the efficiency of the military.

Menon, in the face of intense opposition, also began the creation of a domestic military industrial complex to supply the Indian armed forces with weaponry and provisions.

Annexation of Portuguese India
The annexation of Goa was closely linked with the 1961 elections to the Lok Sabha. With the race looming, Menon aggressively addressed the issue of Indian sovereignty over the Portuguese colony of Goa, in a partial reprise of his earlier defence of Indian Kashmir. In New York, Menon met US Ambassador and two-time presidential candidate Adlai Stevenson behind closed doors, before meeting with President John F. Kennedy, who had expressed his reservations about Menon's anti-imperialism during the state visit of Jawaharlal Nehru. Menon lectured Kennedy on the importance of US-Soviet compromise, before returning to India. On 17 December 1961, Menon and the Indian Army overran Goa, leading to widespread Western condemnation. In his typical style, Menon dismissed the admonishments of Kennedy and Stevenson as "vestige(s) of Western imperialism". Menon's spearheading of the Indian annexation of Goa had subtle ramifications throughout Asia, as in the case of Indonesian president Sukarno, who refrained from invading the Portuguese colony of East Timor partially from fear of being compared to Menon. The invasion also spawned a complex mass of legal issues relating to differences between eastern and western interpretations of United Nations law and jurisdiction.

The Sino-Indian War
In 1962 China attacked India, leading to the brief Sino-Indian War, and a temporary reversal in India's non-aligned foreign policy. Menon was heavily criticised both inside and outside parliament for ineffectiveness and poorly handling of defence matters. The Indian government's analysis, the Henderson Brooks–Bhagat Report remains classified. Some suggest that aspiring to become a world leader, Menon undermined the intelligence reports dating back to 1955 about Chinese preparations to defend its land claim on disputed areas. A chagrined Menon was responsible for India's lack of military readiness and was forced to tender his resignation on Oct-31-1962 as Minister of Defence in spite of Nehru protecting him by first making him Minister of Defence Production and then minister without portfolio.

Although Menon's role in the development of India's military infrastructure was initially overshadowed by India's unpreparedness in the Sino-Indian War, later analysis and scholarship has increasingly focused on the importance of Menon's vision and foresight in military development, with political figures as varied as President and Minister of Defence R. Venkataraman and Justice V.R. Krishna Iyer of the Supreme Court of India analysing and defending Menon's role in India's rise as a military power.

Elections

Rajya Sabha
Menon was elected to the Rajya Sabha in 1953 from Madras which subsequently became a seat from Kerala following the States Reorganisation Act of 1956.

1957
In 1957, Menon sought a seat in the Lok Sabha, contesting a constituency from North Mumbai. Widely viewed as a hero for his defence of India's sovereignty in Kashmir on the world stage, Menon was met with rapturous receptions on the campaign trail, and ultimately won in a straight contest against PSP candidate Alvares Peter Augustus by 47,741 votes (171,708 to 123,967).

1961

In October 1961, Menon, the sitting Defence Minister, was challenged by the 74-year-old Acharya Kripalani, a previous president of the Indian National Congress and close associate of the deceased Mohandas Gandhi. The race soon became the highest-profile in India, with the Sunday Standard remarking that "no political campaign in India has ever been so bitter or so remarkable for the nuances it produced". The race, which witnessed the direct intervention of Jawaharlal Nehru, was widely viewed as of tremendous importance due to the personas and influence of the two candidates, who were seen as avatars for two distinct ideologies. Having previously endorsed Menon's foreign policies, Kripalani relentlessly attacked Menon's persona, seeking to avoid direct confrontation with the prestige of Nehru and the Congress Party. Ultimately, Menon won in a landslide, nearly doubling the vote total of Kripalani, and winning outright majorities in all six of North Mumbai's districts. The electoral results established Menon as second only to Nehru in Indian politics.

1967
By 1967, Menon had completely lost his public image after India's debacle in the 1962 war with China. However, he still wanted to contest elections and be a member of parliament. He was denied a seat from Mumbai by the Congress on the grounds that he was a non-Maharashtrian. This followed the surge in popularity for the Shiv Sena, with its sons-of-the-soil agenda. He was not offered a seat anywhere else in the country either. Menon resigned from the Congress and stood for elections as an independent candidate from the North East Mumbai constituency, of which he was the sitting member of parliament. He lost to the Congress candidate, Mr. S.G. Barve, a retired ICS officer, by a margin of 13,169 votes. Mr. Barve died later that year, and his sister, Mrs. Tara Sapre, contested the by-election which ensued as the Congress candidate. Menon again stood as an independent, and lost to Mrs. Tara Sapre by a wider margin than had been the case with her brother.

1969
In 1969, Menon contested a seat in the Lok Sabha from the Bengal constituency of Midnapore, running as an independent in a by-election, and defeating his Congress rival by a margin of 106,767 votes in May of that year.

1971

In 1971, Menon contested as an independent candidate and was elected to the Lok Sabha from Trivandrum, in his home state of Kerala.

Controversies

Evaluations
Menon was an intensely controversial figure during his life, and has remained so even well after his death. Widely described as brilliant and arrogant, he was known for the sheer force of his personality, and for his eloquence and wit as an orator. In response to US Secretary of State John Foster Dulles' assertion that US weapons supplied to Pakistan were intended solely for defence against a Soviet invasion, Menon snapped that "the world has yet to see an American gun that can only shoot in one direction", and that "I am yet to come across a vegetarian tiger". In London, Menon responded to novelist Brigid Brophy's surprise at the quality of his English with the retort: "my English is better than yours. You merely picked it up: I learnt it." When criticised for the Rolls-Royces he kept as official vehicles, he replied, "I can scarcely hire a bullock-cart to call on 10 Downing Street". Personally, Menon preferred to use London's double-decker buses whenever possible, underscoring the contrast between his public appearance as a statesman and his personal asceticism. Indian President R. Venkataraman would later describe him as "the very epitome of a representative of the (...) Indian State, personally abstemious but at the same time uncompromising in maintaining the prestige of his high office."

Privately, his Indian colleagues had a mixed view.  Foreign Secretary Subimal Dutt commented that Menon, "did not always measure his words" . Another Indian diplomat, C. S. Jha,  said that Menon was "an outstanding world statesman but the world's worst diplomat", adding that "his lack of diplomatic finesse and the abrasive manner in which he projected and expounded India's views needlessly caused offense and did India's and Nehru's image much harm", adding that Menon had an "acid tongue" and was often "overbearing, churlish and vindictive".  Ambassador to Moscow, K. P. S. Menon said he was "insufferable".

Menon was widely reviled by Western statesmen who loathed his arrogance, outspokenness, and fiercely anti-Western stances. American President Dwight D. Eisenhower considered the outwardly courteous Menon a "menace ... governed by ambition to prove himself the master international manipulator and politician of the age". Western publications routinely referred to him as "India's Rasputin" or "Nehru's Evil Genius".

Jeep scandal
The jeep scandal case in 1948 was the first major corruption case in independent India. Menon, then Indian high commissioner to Britain, ignored protocols and signed a Rs 8 million contract for the purchase of army jeeps with a foreign firm. While most of the money was paid upfront and 155 jeeps landed.

Personal life

In private, Menon abstained from tobacco, alcohol and meat, often fasting for days, and forwent his luxury townhouse in Kensington Palace Gardens in favour of a single room in the Indian High Commission during his official tenure in London. As high commissioner, Menon drew only the token salary of one rupee per month, later refusing a salary outright. Menon nonetheless dressed publicly in bespoke suits, earning him the epithet  "Mephistopheles in a Savile Row suit".

Death
Menon died at the age of 78 on 6 October 1974, whereupon Indian Prime Minister Indira Gandhi remarked that "a volcano is extinct". At a 1984 memorial lecture for Menon, K. R. Narayanan extolled that "India has been fortunate to have had not only a glorious heritage of culture and civilisation but a succession of great men from the Buddha to Gandhi, from Ashoka to Nehru, from Kautilya to Menon."

Commemoration
The V. K. Krishna Menon Institute was established in 2006 to commemorate and facilitate the life, times and achievements of Menon. One of the Institute's objectives include awarding people from India and diaspora from Asia for their significant accomplishments in the fields of science, literature, economics, politics, diplomacy and human rights.

A blue plaque commemorating Menon was placed at 30 Langdon Park Road, in Highgate, London by English Heritage in 2013.

References

Bibliography
 Abraham, Itty. "From Bandung to NAM: Non-alignment and Indian Foreign Policy, 1947–1965", Commonwealth & Comparative Politics 46#2 (2008): 195–219.
 Brecher, Michael. "Elite Images and Foreign Policy Choices: Krishna Menon's View of the World." Pacific Affairs 40.1/2 (1967): 60–92. online
 Brecher, Michael, and Janice Gross Stein. India and world politics: Krishna Menon's view of the world (Praeger, 1968).
  online free to borrow
 Lengyel, Krishna_Menon (1962) online free
 McGarr, Paul M. "'A Serious Menace to Security': British Intelligence, V.K. Krishna Menon and the Indian High Commission in London, 1947–52." Journal of Imperial and Commonwealth History 38.3 (2010): 441–469.
 McGarr, Paul M. ""India's Rasputin"?: V.K. Krishna Menon and Anglo–American Misperceptions of Indian Foreign Policymaking, 1947–1964." Diplomacy & Statecraft 22.2 (2011): 239–260.
 Janaki Ram, V. K. Krishna Menon: a personal memoir (1997).

External links
 

 Vengalil Krishnan Krishna Menon
 P. N. Haksar: Krishna: As I knew him
 Statements by V. K. Krishna Menon at the United Nations
 T. J. S. George: `Krishna Menon', Jonathan Cape, 1964.
 Theft of two statues of Menon from a London park
 
 How a young man from Calicut became the publisher who helped change British thinking

|-

|-

|-

|-

1896 births
1974 deaths
Malayali politicians
Union Ministers from Kerala
Indian Hindus
People from Kozhikode district
Presidency College, Chennai alumni
Alumni of the London School of Economics
Alumni of University College London
Alumni of the University of London
Alumni of the Inns of Court School of Law
Members of the Middle Temple
Indian independence activists from Kerala
20th-century Indian lawyers
Indian civil rights activists
Indian National Congress politicians from Kerala
Indian nationalists
Nehru administration
Defence Ministers of India
India MPs 1957–1962
India MPs 1962–1967
India MPs 1967–1970
India MPs 1971–1977
Politicians from Mumbai
Recipients of the Padma Vibhushan in public affairs
Recipients of the Order of the Companions of O. R. Tambo
Rajya Sabha members from Kerala
Lok Sabha members from Maharashtra
Lok Sabha members from Kerala
University of Madras alumni
Indian legal scholars
20th-century Indian educational theorists
20th-century Indian economists
Penguin Books people
Lok Sabha members from West Bengal
Indian academic administrators
Scholars from Kerala
People of the Sino-Indian War
High Commissioners of India to the United Kingdom
Ambassadors of India to Ireland
Scholars of Indian foreign policy
People charged with corruption